Lieutenant-General Daniel Hogan (born 1895) was Chief of Staff of the Defence Forces in Ireland from March 1927 to February 1929.

Early life and education
Daniel Hogan was born in 1895 in Grangemockler, Clonmel, County Tipperary into a farming family. He moved to Monaghan in 1918 where he worked as a clerk for the Great Northern Railway Company, based in Clones. It was there that he met Eoin O'Duffy and the two became friendly, with Hogan first joining the GAA and later the Irish Volunteers.

Career
During the Irish War of Independence he quickly rose in the ranks to become second in command to Eoin O’Duffy in the Monaghan area. He also continued his involvement with the GAA, played senior football for Monaghan and was arrested, along with O’Duffy, before a game between Cavan and Armagh after refusing to apply for permits from the British authorities to hold the match. In November 1920 his brother Michael Hogan, also a member of the Irish Volunteers and captain of Tipperary was shot dead at Croke Park on Bloody Sunday (the Hogan Stand was named after him). After his release from prison Dan Hogan continued to play an active role in the border areas and by the time of the truce was in command of the 5th Northern Division of the IRA. During the handover of power at Dublin Castle he attended the blessing of the tricolour and had the honour of being the first to raise the flag officially at the ceremony, attended by Michael Collins. He supported the Anglo-Irish Treaty and joined the Free State Army at the beginning of the Irish Civil War rising to the rank of Major General of the Eastern Command. It was during this period that he came to public attention after the general manager of the Great Northern Railway Company, John Bagwell, was kidnapped by anti-treaty forces, on hearing of the kidnapping Hogan issued a proclamation to the effect that if he was not safely released, reprisals would be taken against anti-treaty prisoners in custody. Within less than 24 hours of the proclamation Bagwell was released. He continued serving with the army after the end of the Civil War and in 1927 succeeded General Peader McMahon as Chief of Staff of the Defence Forces. He resigned from this post in 1929 after a dispute with the then Minister of Defence, Desmond Fitzgerald.

Life in America
He lived first at 13 Lincoln Avenue, Massapequa, Long Island, with his wife Betty Hogan (née Flynn), then they moved to 233 Ashland Place, Brooklyn, in the mid 1930s. He corresponded with the Department of Defence with regards his pension in late 1939 but his wife and daughter had not been in contact with him since 1938. He then started to use an address c/o Reverend Brother Wilfred Hogan, Christian Brothers, Westland Row in Dublin and getting pension cheques sent there. He moved back to Dublin for about 6 months before going back to the United States in 1940, where he used his last known address which was c/o McBride, 5320 Dorchester Avenue, Chicago, Illinois, suggesting he may have been drifting or at least not settled or didn't want to be tracked by family. The last contact he had with the Department of Defence was January 1940 and his last pension payment cashed was in June 1941. After that he is unaccounted for. To date, after 1941, Dan Hogan's last whereabouts or fate have never been established. According to Fearghal McGarry's biography of Eoin O'Duffy, "Hogan left for the United States under a cloud, financial or sexual. He was killed in a bar brawl there in the early 1940s"

References

1895 births
Year of death missing
Chiefs of Staff of the Defence Forces (Ireland)
Irish Army generals
National Army (Ireland) generals
People from Clonmel
Military personnel from County Tipperary